Ratanakiri Airport  is an airport in Ban Lung town in Ratanakiri Province, Cambodia.

History 
In November 2005, there was a minor accident at Ratanakiri Airport when a plane arriving from Phnom Penh hit the side of the runway and ground looped, which caused the right hand main landing gear to collapse. The Y-7-100C aircraft was operated by PMT Air and leased from Royal Phnom Penh Airways. There were 59 passengers and 6 crew aboard at the time of the crash, but there were no fatalities. In the wake of this incident, and the more serious crash of PMTair Flight 241 in Kampot in July, PMT Air ceased regular commercial flights to Ratanakiri. Since then, no commercial flights to Ban Lung are available and only chartered and private flights use the airport.

References

External links
 

Airports in Cambodia
Buildings and structures in Ratanakiri province